Nicklas Kulti (born 22 April 1971) is a former professional tennis player from Sweden. He was born in Stockholm.

Tennis career

Juniors
Kulti was ranked No. 1 in the junior world singles rankings in 1989 after winning the Australian Open and Wimbledon junior titles, and finishing runner-up at the US Open.

Pro tour
In 1990, Kulti won his first top-level singles title at Adelaide. He won a total of three tour singles titles during his professional career. He also won 13 top-level doubles titles, including the Monte Carlo Masters in 1994 (partnering Magnus Larsson) and the Paris Masters in 2000 (partnering Max Mirnyi). Kulti was a men's doubles runner-up at the French Open in 1995 (with Larsson) and the US Open in 1997 (with Jonas Björkman). Kulti's best singles performance at a Grand Slam event came at the 1992 French Open, where he reached the quarter-finals by defeating John McEnroe, Markus Zillner, Michael Chang and Diego Pérez before being knocked-out by Henri Leconte.

Kulti was a member of the Swedish teams which won the Davis Cup in both 1997 and 1998 (partnering Björkman to win doubles rubbers in the final on both occasions). He was also on the team which finished runners-up in the Davis Cup in 1996. In the fifth and deciding match against Frenchman Arnaud Boetsch, Kulti was a late replacement for the injured Stefan Edberg. In a 4-hour and 46-minute thriller, Boetsch saved three matchpoints and finally overcame Kulti, 7–6, 2–6, 4–6, 7–6, 10–8.

Kulti's career-high rankings were World No. 32 in singles (in 1993), and World No. 11 in doubles (in 1997). His career prize-money totalled $3,186,946. He retired from the professional tour in 2000. He runs the Good to Great Tennis Academy together with Magnus Norman and Mikael Tillström.

Junior Grand Slam finals

Singles: 4 (2 titles, 2 runner-ups)

ATP career finals

Singles: 7 (3 titles, 4 runner-ups)

Doubles: 25 (13 titles, 12 runner-ups)

ATP Challenger and ITF Futures Finals

Singles: 1 (0–1)

Doubles: 7 (6–1)

Performance timelines

Singles

Doubles

Mixed doubles

References

External links 
 
 
 
 www.goodtogreatworld.com

Australian Open (tennis) junior champions
Tennis players from Stockholm
Swedish male tennis players
Wimbledon junior champions
1971 births
Living people
Tennis players at the 1996 Summer Olympics
Tennis players at the 2000 Summer Olympics
Grand Slam (tennis) champions in boys' singles
Olympic tennis players of Sweden